Alexi Murdoch (born 27 December 1973) is a British folk musician and songwriter. Since his debut in 2002, Murdoch has released two LPs and one EP. His music has been featured in numerous television shows and films.

Early life and education 
Murdoch was born in London to a Greek father and Louise Cordet, an English singer, and lived in Greece until he was ten, when his family settled in Scotland.

Murdoch moved to the United States in 1992 to study at Duke University, before moving to Los Angeles, California to live with his then girlfriend.

Career 
He first gained attention when Nic Harcourt began playing his music on KCRW. Despite increased interest, Murdoch largely turned down advances from record labels and continued to release his music independently.

Four Songs
He self-released the EP Four Songs through independent record stores and website CD Baby in November 2002. CD Baby sold over 50,000 copies of the release, becoming the site's all-time best-selling record.

In 2003, he performed at the South by Southwest (SXSW) Music Conference and that year's Sundance Film Festival, and, in 2004, at the Hollywood Reporter/Billboard Film & TV Music Conference. In 2004, the song "Orange Sky" from the EP also became the most-played song on Philadelphia indie station WXPN.

Time Without Consequence
Murdoch's first album, Time Without Consequence, was released on 6 June 2006 on his own label, Zero Summer. As with the EP, Murdoch continued to turn down the record deals he was offered from numerous major labels to maintain creative control. (The record was distributed nationally through Sony BMG.) Time Without Consequence peaked at No. 25 on the Billboard Heatseekers chart.

On 9 June 2006, Murdoch began a 34 city tour in conjunction with the Coalition of Independent Music Stores, with most bookings at independent record stores.

The album became one of the most licensed albums of the decade, receiving placements on dozens of films and television shows:
 "Orange Sky" appeared in The O.C., House, Prison Break, Ugly Betty, Dirty Sexy Money, Ladder 49, Suburgatory, and Southland, as well as in promotions for Oscar nominated foreign film, Paradise Now and a Honda commercial.
 "Home" appeared in a season 2 episode of Prison Break.
 "All My Days" was featured in The O.C., Grey's Anatomy, Scrubs, Without a Trace, Stargate Universe, Sense8, Conversations with Friends, and a promo for Southland. It has also featured as the opening song in the movie Real Steel and the final episode of Years of Living Dangerously.
 "Song For You" appeared in Everwood.
 "12" appeared in the shows "Brothers & Sisters" and "One Tree Hill."
 "Blue Mind" was featured in the 2008 adventure film The Sharp End,, played over the final credits sequence of the 2014 independent film WildLike, and was used in several episodes of Dawson's Creek. 
 "Wait" was used in the shows Defying Gravity and Parenthood; as well as the 2017 movie "Different Flowers".
 "It's Only Fear" was used in the Brothers and Sisters.
 "Breathe" and "All My Days" were used in Stargate Universe, and the 2008 film Tenderness, where the album Time Without Consequence is also shown on a scene of the film.
 Nine of Murdoch's songs were used in the 2009 film Away We Go, constituting most of the soundtrack. Three of these were unreleased at the time; "Towards the Sun" and "Crinan Wood" were later released on Murdoch's 2011 album "Towards the Sun".
 Several songs were used in a surfing documentary One California Day. "Crinan Wood" was used in the episode Chuck Versus the Masquerade from the show Chuck.

Towards the Sun
Murdoch's second album, Towards the Sun, was initially released in 2009 in the US by Zero Summer Records. It was later released in the UK and Germany in 2011 by label City Slang. The song "Some Day Soon" appeared in a season 1 and a season 4 episode of This Is Us.

Touring
In the spring of 2009, Murdoch embarked on a headlining tour, during which he distributed an early version of a new album entitled Towards the Sun in a limited edition packaged in a hand-printed, cardboard sleeve.

Other bookings by Murdoch include two concerts in Berlin, one small club appearance and a second as part of the City Slang label's 20th anniversary. In February 2011, he performed in New York City as part of Lincoln Center's prestigious "American Songbook Series". Afterwards, he went on a sold-out tour of major markets throughout North America. (i.e. Philadelphia, Los Angeles, San Francisco, Seattle, Portland, Vancouver, Chicago, Minneapolis.) 2011 also saw the official release of his third recording, "Towards The Sun".

Critical reception
Murdoch has been compared to the late British singer-songwriter Nick Drake. His first album Time Without Consequence was met with wide critical praise, gaining him five stars with Alternative Press as well as placing him on Rolling Stone'''s Top Ten Artists list. His newest release Towards the Sun is gathering higher praise still in both the US and in Europe. PopMatters, giving the record a 9/10 calls Murdoch's performance "hauntingly beautiful" and "heartbreakingly lovely". Q magazine in the UK give the record four stars with this to say: "Acoustic troubadour makes stunning second outing. Anyone who harps on about how the songwriters of today don't match up to those of yesteryear should be directed to this remarkable second record."

Discography

Studio albums
 Time Without Consequence (Zero Summer Records, 2006)
 Towards the Sun (Zero Summer Records, City Slang, 2009)

Extended plays
 Four Songs (Mindblue Music, 2002, EP)

Original Soundtrack albums
 Away We Go''  (Zero Summer, 2009)

References

External links
 Official website
 CNN: The 'Britney' backlash: Budding songwriter rejects record contract
 Alexi Murdoch at NPR Music
 

1973 births
Living people
British male singer-songwriters
City Slang artists
English people of Scottish descent
British people of Greek descent
British people of French descent
British expatriates in the United States
Musicians from London
Duke University alumni
21st-century British singers
21st-century British male singers